Santhia or Santhià may refer to:

Places
 Santhià, an Italian municipality in the Piedmont region
 Santhia Upazila, an administrative area in Bangladesh (formerly Santhia in India)

People
 Enrico Santià (b 1918), an Italian football player
 Giuseppe Santhià, an Italian cyclist and stage winner in the 1911 and 1913 Giro d'Italia
 Ignatius of Santhià (1686–1770), an Italian Roman Catholic priest

Other uses
 SS Santhia, a 1901 steamship of the British India Steam Navigation Company